Edyta Górniak is the self-titled second studio album and first international album by Polish singer Edyta Górniak. It was released in Japan under the name Kiss Me, Feel Me.

Reception 
The eponymous album sold more than 150,000 copies worldwide and was successful in Japan, South Africa, and Europe. It was certified a Platinum album by the Polish Society of the Phonographic Industry (ZPAV) in 1998.

Track listing

Standard release

 "Anything"
 "If I Give Myself (Up) To You"
 "Perfect Moment"
 "When You Come Back To Me"
 "Be Good Or Be Gone"
 "One & One"
 "Linger"
 "Soul Boy"
 "I Don't Know What's On Your Mind"
 "The Day I Get Over You"
 "Miles & Miles Away"
 "That's The Way I Feel About You"
 "Gone"

Japanese version (entitled Kiss Me, Feel Me)

 "Coming Back To Love" (Bonus track)
 "Hunting High & Low" (Bonus track)
 "Under Her Spell" (Bonus track)

Polish special re-edition
 "Hunting High & Low" (Bonus track)
 "Coming Back To Love" (Bonus track)
 "Hope For Us" (Duet with José Carreras) (Bonus track)

Release history

 Japan: November 7, 1997
 Poland: November 10, 1997
 Switzerland: 1998

Charts

References

1997 albums
Albums produced by Christopher Neil